The Central Afghan Mountains xeric woodlands ecoregion (WWF ID: PA1309) covers the xeric (dry) eastern and southern slopes of the central mountain range of Afghanistan, between the sandy desert to the south and the alpine meadows in the higher, wetter region to the north.  Despite the 'woodlands' in the ecoregion name, very little of the territory is forested – less than 1% – but is instead sparse vegetation or herbaceous cover.

Location and description 
The central mountain ranges of the Afghanistan are western extensions of the Hindu Kush mountains in the northeast of the country. These subranges center on the Koh-i-Baba (Baba Mountain Range) the Koh-e Paghman Mountains.

Climate 
The driest month between April and September does not have more than 30 millimeters of precipitation.

Flora 
According to satellite analysis, 65% of the ecoregion is bare or sparse vegetation, and another 27% is "herbaceous cover".  There are communities of wild pistachio trees (Pistacia atlantica) at altitudes of 1,150-1,800 meters.  Precipitation at these altitudes averages 250-400 mm/year.  Higher, at 2,000-2,800 meters, Almond trees of genus Prunus mark a transition zone to the higher sub-alpine vegetation.

Fauna 
Of conservation interest in the ecoregion is the critically endangered Paghman mountain salamandar (Afghanodon mustersi).  A large saline lake, Ab-i Istada in the ecoregion, is an important migratory stop in the Spring for waterfowl traveling between Siberia and the Ganges Plain of India.  The site has a significant breeding population of American flamingos (Phoenicopterus ruber).

Protected areas 
There are no protected areas in this ecoregion.

References 

Palearctic ecoregions
Ecoregions of Afghanistan